Germán Legarreta (born August 30, 1981) is a Puerto Rican actor.

Biography

Early life
Legarreta was born Germán Legarreta Quiles in San Juan, Puerto Rico; it did not take long for him to get his first big break—a commercial when he was just three years old. Throughout his formative years, he balanced a career as a successful child star and a competitive gymnast. Germán soon emerged as "someone to watch" , and he and traveled to competitions throughout the United States, Europe and Central America.

Acting career
With roles on the Puerto Rican TV series, Ola nueva, La (1988) and Somos Unicos under his belt, at the age of 14, German beat out numerous other young stars for the role of "Freddy" in the hit theatrical release, Roller Kids. A role on Telemundo's popular TV series, Dame Un Break, soon followed, and German was recognized as a true teen star. While enjoying his newfound fame in Puerto Rico, he continued to hone his craft under the guidance of several prestigious acting coaches.

In 2001, German left Puerto Rico to pursue his dreams in Hollywood. Since arriving, he gave memorable performances in a variety of feature films: Chasing Papi (2003), Jail Bait (2004), The Only Word, as well as Showtime's critically acclaimed new cutting–edge drama series, Dexter (2006). Additionally, he has appeared in countless music videos alongside some of the industry's biggest names, including Mariah Carey, Fiona Apple, Pink, Jamie Foxx, Tweet, Fantasia, Britney Spears, Alanis Morissette, and Sade, among others.

Later this year, German returns to the big screen as the lead in the highly anticipated thriller, 7eventy 5ive (2007), a role that he believes "will have people talking."

Filmography

Films

Television

External links
 

1981 births
Living people
American male film actors
American male television actors
American people of Puerto Rican descent
Hispanic and Latino American male actors
Male actors from San Juan, Puerto Rico